Good Friends and Faithful Neighbours (Swedish: Goda vänner och trogna grannar) is a 1938 Swedish comedy film directed by Weyler Hildebrand and starring Ludde Gentzel, Greta Almroth and Eric Abrahamsson. It was shot at the Råsunda Studios in Stockholm. The film's sets were designed by the art director Arne Åkermark.

Cast
 Ludde Gentzel as 	Ludvig Ask
 Greta Almroth as 	Laura Ask
 Eric Abrahamsson as Erik Jerker Karlsson
 Ruth Weijden as Kristina Karlsson
 Marianne Aminoff as 	Greta Ask
 Kotti Chave as 	Arne Karlsson
 Bror Bügler as 	Henrik Norling
 Olle Hilding as 	Emil Norling
 Olav Riégo as 	Mr. Morton
 Hilda Castegren as Rosa
 Richard Lund as Gebel
 Magnus Kesster as John
 Wiktor Andersson as Nisse Klöver 
 Manne Grünberger as 	Pelle
 Nils Jacobsson as 	Fast
 Millan Bolander as Mrs. Mallander 
 Vera Lindby as Viola, Greta's friend 
 Gunnar Höglund as 	Kalle, Greta's brother
 Helga Brofeldt as 	Mrs. Johansson, woman at the sale 
 Ingrid Envall as Girl
 Siri Olson as 	Shop clerk
 Anna-Stina Wåglund as	Shop clerk

References

Bibliography 
 Wallengren, Ann-Kristin.  Welcome Home Mr Swanson: Swedish Emigrants and Swedishness on Film. Nordic Academic Press, 2014.

External links 
 

1938 films
Swedish comedy films
1938 comedy films
1930s Swedish-language films
Films directed by Weyler Hildebrand
Films set in Stockholm
1930s Swedish films